Boyd Fletcher Devereaux (born April 16, 1978) is a Canadian former professional ice hockey player. 

Drafted 6th overall in the 1996 NHL Draft by the Edmonton Oilers, Devereaux is best known for forming 1/3 of the "Two Kids and a Goat" line as a member of the Detroit Red Wings, alongside Pavel Datsyuk and Brett Hull, ultimately culminating in the 2002 Stanley Cup championship.

Playing career
Devereaux spent his junior hockey career playing for the Kitchener Rangers of the Ontario Hockey League (OHL). He was drafted sixth overall by the Edmonton Oilers in the 1996 NHL Entry Draft and would go on to play 627 career NHL games, scoring 67 goals and 112 assists for 179 points.

In the summer of 2000, Devereaux signed with the Detroit Red Wings, with whom he won the Stanley Cup in 2002. In 2004, he signed with the Phoenix Coyotes, where he played for one season. In October 2006, after failing to make the Red Wings roster on a tryout basis, the Toronto Maple Leafs signed him. He began the season in the American Hockey League with the Toronto Marlies but quickly worked his way back to the NHL.  After a season and a half with the Maple Leafs, Devereaux cleared waivers and was sent back to the Marlies for the 2008-09 season.

On February 14, 2009, Devereaux was recalled to play for the Maple Leafs again after he was put on re-entry waivers and no other team opted to claim him. In the final game of the season, against the Ottawa Senators, Devereaux recorded his second career hat trick, scoring all three goals against Brian Elliott.

While competing in the Spengler Cup in Switzerland on 28 December 2009, Devereaux was collecting a loose puck from the offensive zone when he was caught with his head down and checked by HC Davos defenceman Beat Forster. After being helped from the ice, Devereaux noticed tingling sensations in his limbs and was rushed to hospital. X-rays revealed fractured vertebra. After an MRI, it was decided by the medical staff that surgery was not an option, and that the best course of action was to allow the break to attempt to heal on its own. Devereaux's neck was braced and he was allowed home. He eventually contacted the Leafs' medical staff and had surgery for his neck injury.

International play

Devereaux was named to the 1997 World Junior team representing Canada.  He scored four goals during the tournament including the game-winning goal during the semifinals where Canada beat Russia 3–2, and the game-winning goal during the team's 2–0 victory in the gold-medal game against the United States.  The gold medal was Canada's fifth straight at the tournament.

Personal
Devereaux now resides in Waterloo, Ontario, with his wife and two kids.

Devereaux participated in the 2011 season of Battle of the Blades, a figure skating competition broadcast in Canada on CBC Television.  He and his partner finished in third place.

Career statistics

Regular season and playoffs

International

Awards and honours

References

External links

1978 births
Living people
Battle of the Blades participants
Canadian ice hockey centres
Detroit Red Wings players
Edmonton Oilers draft picks
Edmonton Oilers players
Franco-Ontarian people
Hamilton Bulldogs (AHL) players
Ice hockey people from Ontario
Kitchener Rangers players
HC Lugano players
National Hockey League first-round draft picks
People from Huron County, Ontario
Phoenix Coyotes players
Stanley Cup champions
Toronto Maple Leafs players
Toronto Marlies players
Canadian expatriate ice hockey players in Switzerland